The 7th season of Taniec z gwiazdami, the Polish edition of Dancing with the Stars, started on 2 March 2008 and ended on 25 May 2008. It was broadcast by TVN. Katarzyna Skrzynecka and Piotr Gąsowski continued as the hosts, and the judges were: Iwona Szymańska-Pavlović, Zbigniew Wodecki, Beata Tyszkiewicz and Piotr Galiński.

Couples

Scores

Red numbers indicate the lowest score for each week.
Green numbers indicate the highest score for each week.
 indicates the couple eliminated that week.
 indicates the returning couple that finished in the bottom two.
 indicates the winning couple of the week.
 indicates the runner-up of the week.
 indicates the third place couple of the week.

Notes:

Week 1: Only male celebrities' dances were judged in this episode. Female celebrities danced a group Mambo. Tomasz Schimscheiner was on the top of the leaderboard having scored 33 out of 40 for his Waltz. Mariusz Pudzianowski got 24 points for his Cha-cha-cha, making it the lowest score of the week. Michał & Katarzyna were eliminated.

Week 2: Only female celebrities' dances were judged in this episode. Male celebrities danced a group Swing. Magdalena Walach scored 35 points for her Quickstep and won the episode. Elisabeth Duda got 27 points for her Quickstep, making it the lowest score of the week. Agnieszka & Żora were eliminated despite being 3 points from the bottom.

Week 3: Magdalena & Cezary were on the top of the leaderboard again with 38 points for their Tango. Łukasz Zagrobelny got the season's lowest score (20) for his Jive. Katarzyna & Rafał were eliminated despite being 10 points from the bottom.

Week 4: Elisabeth Duda was on top of the leaderboard, having scored 38 out of 40 for her Paso Doble, but the episode was won by Mariusz Pudzianowski. Marina Łuczenko got 22 points for herPaso Doble, making it the lowest score of the week. Tomasz & Kamila were eliminated despite being 6 points from the bottom.

Week 5: Magdalena Walach got the first perfect score of the season for her Viennese Waltz. Łukasz Zagrobelny got 26 points for his Salsa, making it the lowest score of the week. Marina & Michał were eliminated despite being 4 points from the bottom.

Week 6: Mariusz Pudzianowski and Marek Kaliszuk both scored 37 points for American Smooth and were on top of the leaderboard. Łukasz Zagrobelny got 30 points for his American Smooth, making it the lowest score of the week. Małgorzata & Robert were eliminated despite being 3 points from the bottom.

Week 7: Magdalena Walach, Tamara Arciuch and Wojciech Łozowski all got a perfect score in this episode. Mariusz Pudzianowski got 29 points for his Rumba, making it the lowest score of the week.  Łukasz & Anna were eliminated despite being 8 points from the bottom.

Week 8: Elisabeth Duda was on top of the leaderboard for the second time, but the episode was won by Mariusz Pudzianowski. Robert Janowski got 29 points for his Tango, making it the lowest score of the week. Marek & Nina were eliminated despite being 1 points from the bottom.

Week 9: Magdalena Walach scored 38 out of 40 for her Foxtrot and won the episode. Mariusz Pudzianowski got 31 points for his Tango, making it the lowest score of the week. Wojciech & Blanka were eliminated despite being 3 points from the bottom.

Week 10: Magdalena & Cezary got their third perfect score for the American Smooth and Tamara Arciuch got her second perfect score for the American Smooth. Even though he was at the bottom of the leaderboard, Mariusz Pudzianowski took the second place in the episode. Elisabeth & Mario were eliminated, despite being 20 points from the bottom. This was the highest score difference between the eliminated and the lowest-scoring couple in history of the show.

Week 11: Magdalena Walach and Tamara Arciuch both scored 38 points for Jive and 40 points for Tango. Robert & Anna were eliminated.

Week 12: Every couple got a perfect score for the Argentine Tango. Tamara & Łukasz were eliminated.

Week 13: Magdalena & Cezary got the highest possible score with perfect scores for all three dances: Jive, Argentine Tango and Freestyle. Mariusz & Magdalena received a perfect score only for the Argentine Tango. Magdalena Walach & Cezary Olszewski were proclaimed the winners of this season. This marks the fifth time the winner was also on the first place on the judges' general scoreboard and the second time one couple's Freestyle didn't get a perfect score. Peter J. Lucas' didn't get a perfect score for his Freestyle too, in Season 4.

Special Star

Average Chart

Average Dance Chart

Highest and lowest scoring performances

The best and worst performances in each dance according to the judges' marks are as follows:

The Best Score (40)

Episodes

Week 1
Individual judges scores in charts below (given in parentheses) are listed in this order from left to right: Iwona Szymańska-Pavlović, Zbigniew Wodecki, Beata Tyszkiewicz and Piotr Galiński.

Running order

Week 2
Individual judges scores in charts below (given in parentheses) are listed in this order from left to right: Iwona Szymańska-Pavlović, Zbigniew Wodecki, Beata Tyszkiewicz and Piotr Galiński.

Running order

Week 3
Individual judges scores in charts below (given in parentheses) are listed in this order from left to right: Iwona Szymańska-Pavlović, Zbigniew Wodecki, Beata Tyszkiewicz and Piotr Galiński.

Running order

Week 4
Individual judges scores in charts below (given in parentheses) are listed in this order from left to right: Iwona Szymańska-Pavlović, Zbigniew Wodecki, Beata Tyszkiewicz and Piotr Galiński.

Running order

Week 5
Individual judges scores in charts below (given in parentheses) are listed in this order from left to right: Iwona Szymańska-Pavlović, Zbigniew Wodecki, Beata Tyszkiewicz and Piotr Galiński.

Running order

Week 6
Individual judges scores in charts below (given in parentheses) are listed in this order from left to right: Iwona Szymańska-Pavlović, Zbigniew Wodecki, Beata Tyszkiewicz and Piotr Galiński.

Running order

Week 7
Individual judges scores in charts below (given in parentheses) are listed in this order from left to right: Iwona Szymańska-Pavlović, Zbigniew Wodecki, Beata Tyszkiewicz and Piotr Galiński.

Running order

Week 8: French Week
Individual judges scores in charts below (given in parentheses) are listed in this order from left to right: Iwona Szymańska-Pavlović, Zbigniew Wodecki, Beata Tyszkiewicz and Piotr Galiński.

Running order

Week 9: James Bond Week
Individual judges scores in charts below (given in parentheses) are listed in this order from left to right: Iwona Szymańska-Pavlović, Zbigniew Wodecki, Beata Tyszkiewicz and Piotr Galiński.

Running order

Week 10
Individual judges scores in charts below (given in parentheses) are listed in this order from left to right: Iwona Szymańska-Pavlović, Zbigniew Wodecki, Beata Tyszkiewicz and Piotr Galiński.

Running order

Week 11: Polish Week
Individual judges scores in charts below (given in parentheses) are listed in this order from left to right: Iwona Szymańska-Pavlović, Zbigniew Wodecki, Beata Tyszkiewicz and Piotr Galiński.

Running order

Week 12
Individual judges scores in charts below (given in parentheses) are listed in this order from left to right: Iwona Szymańska-Pavlović, Zbigniew Wodecki, Beata Tyszkiewicz and Piotr Galiński.

Running order

Week 13: Final
Individual judges scores in charts below (given in parentheses) are listed in this order from left to right: Iwona Szymańska-Pavlović, Zbigniew Wodecki, Beata Tyszkiewicz and Piotr Galiński.

Running order

Another Dances

Dance Schedule
The celebrities and professional partners danced one of these routines for each corresponding week.
 Week 1: Cha-Cha-Cha or Waltz (Men) & Group Mambo (Women)
 Week 2: Rumba or Quickstep (Women) & Group Swing (Men)
 Week 3: Jive (Men) or Tango (Women)
 Week 4: Paso Doble (Women) or Foxtrot (Men)
 Week 5: Salsa (Men) or Viennese Waltz (Women)
 Week 6: Samba (Women) or American Smooth (Men)
 Week 7: One unlearned dance
 Week 8: One unlearned dance & Group Viennese Waltz (French Song Week)
 Week 9: One unlearned dance & Group Freestyle
 Week 10: One unlearned Latin dance & One unlearned Ballroom dance
 Week 11: One unlearned & one repeated dance (Polish Week)
 Week 12: Argentine Tango & final unlearned Latin dance
 Week 13: Favorite Latin dance, favorite Ballroom dance & Freestyle

Dance Chart

 Highest scoring dance
 Lowest scoring dance
 Performed, but not scored

Weekly results
The order is based on the judges' scores combined with the viewers' votes.

 This couple came in first place with the judges.
 This couple came in first place with the judges and gained the highest number of viewers' votes.
 This couple gained the highest number of viewers' votes.
 This couple came in last place with the judges and gained the highest number of viewers' votes.
 This couple came in last place with the judges.
 This couple came in last place with the judges and was eliminated.
 This couple was eliminated.
 This couple won the competition.
 This couple came in second in the competition.
 This couple came in third in the competition.

Audience voting results

Rating Figures

External links
 Official Site - Taniec z gwiazdami
 Taniec z gwiazdami on Polish Wikipedia

References

Season 07
2008 Polish television seasons